Carol Field (March 27, 1940 – March 10, 2017) was an American cookbook author, writer, and librarian.  She is known for introducing Americans to the variety of Italian breads with her book The Italian Baker.

Education 
Born Carol Helen Hart in Oakland, California, Field attended Anna Head School for Girls and Wellesley College, where she graduated with a bachelor's degree in English in 1961.

Personal life 
She married John Field, an architect who died in February 2017. Together, they had a son named Matt and a daughter named Alison.

Career 
Field worked as a librarian at the San Francisco Public Library. She opened Minerva's Owl bookstore with a partner in 1962.

After traveling with her husband to Italy, Field learned Italian and began to explore Italian cooking, though her first book, Hill Towns of Italy (1983), explored the history of towns in the Italian regions of Tuscany and Umbria. The Italian Baker was first published in 1985. A year later, the International Association of Culinary Professionals honored the work with an award. After it had gone out of print, a bookseller from New York told her "It's like not being able to find Jane Austen," and Field worked to republish her best known work, releasing it for a second time in 2011.

A prolific writer, she wrote for numerous publications including Gourmet and Bon Appétit. In 1994, Italy in Small Bites was named the winner of the Italian Book James Beard Foundation Award. Sixteen years later, The Italian Baker was designated one of the James Beard Foundation's Baker's Dozen, a collection of "indispensable baking books." Field was elected a foreign member of the Accademia Italiana della Cucina in 1993 and the government of Italy named Field a Knight of the Order of Merit in 2004.

Selected works 
Field, Carol. Celebrating Italy. New York: Morrow, 1990.  
Field, Carol. Italy in Small Bites. New York: HarperCollins Publishers, 1993, 2004.
Field, Carol, and Richard Kauffman. The Hill Towns of Italy. San Francisco, Chronicle Books, 1983, 1996. 
Field, Carol. In Nonna's Kitchen: Recipes and Traditions from Italy's Grandmothers. New York: HarperCollins, 2000.  
Field, Carol. Focaccia: Simple Breads from the Italian Oven. San Francisco: Chronicle, 2003.
Field, Carol. Mangoes And Quince. New York: Bloomsbury, 2001, 2008.
Field, Carol. The Italian Baker, Revised; The Classic Tastes of the Italian Countryside--Its Breads, Pizza, Focaccia, Cakes, Pastries, and Cookies. Ten Speed Press, 2011.

Death 
She died of a stroke at home in San Francisco on March 10, 2017, aged 76.

References

External links

1940 births
2017 deaths
American librarians
American women librarians
American cookbook writers
Writers from San Francisco
21st-century American women writers
Wellesley College alumni
Knights of the Order of Merit of the Italian Republic
Writers from Oakland, California
20th-century American women writers
20th-century American non-fiction writers
Women cookbook writers
James Beard Foundation Award winners
American women non-fiction writers
21st-century American non-fiction writers